General elections were held in Montserrat on 20 February 1952. They were the first elections in Montserrat held under universal suffrage, which had been introduced the previous year. The result was a victory for the Montserrat Labour Party, which won all five seats in the Legislative Council.

Campaign
A total of 11 candidates contested the elections, with the MLP running a full slate of candidates and the Merchant Planters putting forward four. As a result, Michael Walkinshaw was elected unopposed in the Central constituency.

Results

Elected MPs

References

Elections in Montserrat
Montserrat
1952 in Montserrat
February 1952 events in North America